Erick Barkley (born February 21, 1978) is an American former professional basketball player. Born in Queens, New York, he played high school basketball at Christ the King Regional High School and the Maine Central Institute and college basketball at St. John's University. He was named First Team All-Big East and an All-American honorable mention in 2000. Barkley was drafted by the Portland Trail Blazers in 2000, and played for the team for two seasons.

Career

In high school, Barkley was a starter on the AAU team the Riverside Hawks, along with future professional basketball players Lamar Odom, Ron Artest, Elton Brand, and Anthony Glover. In 1996, the team went 66-1 in AAU play. Barkley and Artest would both later star at St. John's together, and led the team to the Elite Eight in the 1999 NCAA Tournament.

During the 2000 NBA Draft, Barkley was selected in the first round (28 pick overall) by the Portland Trail Blazers. After two seasons with Portland, he was traded with Steve Kerr and a 2003 second-round pick to the San Antonio Spurs for Antonio Daniels, Amal McCaskill and Charles Smith on August 5, 2002. The Spurs traded Barkley to the Chicago Bulls on October 26, 2002, but he was waived the same day. 

His final NBA game was played on April 17, 2002, in a 92 - 79 win over the Houston Rockets where he recorded 7 points, 3 assists and 2 steals. In total, Barkley only played in the NBA for 2 years, playing 27 games during his career and averaged 2.9 points per game with 1.5 assists and 0.9 rebounds per game.

Barkley played for the G.S. Olympia Larissa B.C. in Larissa, Greece during the 2004–05 season until he was expelled from the league for possessing cannabis. He played his final professional season in 2011 for the Quebec Kebs of the National Basketball League of Canada. When Barkley told team management he was planning to retire due to injuries, he was persuaded to finish out the season as a player-coach.

In 2014, Barkley was coaching a youth basketball game when he allegedly struck the father of an opposing player. Barkley is currently an assistant coach at his high school alma mater, Christ the King Regional High School.

References

External links
NBA.com Profile
Career stats at basketball-reference.com
 Kebs de Québec PBL Player Profile Kebsdequebec.com

1978 births
Living people
Basketball players from New York City
American expatriate basketball people in Canada
American expatriate basketball people in Croatia
American expatriate basketball people in Greece
American expatriate basketball people in Israel
American expatriate basketball people in Poland
American expatriate basketball people in Romania
American expatriate basketball people in Switzerland
American men's basketball players
CBA All-Star Game players
CSU Asesoft Ploiești players
High school basketball coaches in New York (state)
Huntsville Flight players
Ironi Ramat Gan players
KK Split players
Maine Central Institute alumni
Olympia Larissa B.C. players
Peristeri B.C. players
Point guards
Portland Trail Blazers draft picks
Portland Trail Blazers players
SKK Kotwica Kołobrzeg players
Sportspeople from Queens, New York
St. John's Red Storm men's basketball players
Universiade gold medalists for the United States
Universiade medalists in basketball